Deborah Joy Corey (born 1958 in Temperance Vale, New Brunswick) is a Canadian writer whose first novel, Losing Eddie won the 1994 Books in Canada First Novel Award.

The author of numerous articles and stories, Corey's writings have been published in such literary journals as Ploughshares, Carolina Quarterly, Crescent Review, Image, and Grain.  Born and raised in Temperance Vale, New Brunswick, Corey now lives with her husband and two daughters, in a small coastal village in Maine, a site she used as a model for the setting for her latest novel, The Skating Pond (2003).

Bibliography
Losing Eddie - (1993)
The Skating Pond - (2003)

External links
 Random House author profile for Deborah Joy Corey

1958 births
Living people
20th-century Canadian novelists
21st-century Canadian novelists
Writers from New Brunswick
People from York County, New Brunswick
Canadian women novelists
20th-century Canadian women writers
21st-century Canadian women writers
Amazon.ca First Novel Award winners